Bhakta Prahlada means "devotee Prahlada", a devotional character in Hindu mythology. It may refer to:

 Bhakta Prahlada (1932 film) – Telugu film made in 1932
 Bhakta Prahlada (1942 Telugu film) – Telugu film made in 1942
 Bhakta Prahlada (1942 Kannada film) – Kannada film made in 1942
 Bhakta Prahlad (1946 film) – Hindi film made in 1946
 Bhakta Prahlada (1958 film) – Kannada film made in 1958
 Bhakta Prahlada (1967 film) – Telugu film made in 1967
 Bhakta Prahlada (1983 film) – Kannada film made in 1983

See also 
 Prahlada (film), Malayalam film made in 1941
 Prahalada (film), Tamil film made in 1939